One third of Craven District Council in North Yorkshire, England is elected each year, followed by one year when there is an election to North Yorkshire County Council instead. Since the last boundary changes in 2002, 30 councillors have been elected from 19 wards.

Political control
Since the first election to the council in 1973 political control of the council has been held by the following parties:

Leadership
The leaders of the council since 2000 have been:

Council elections
Summary of the council composition after recent council elections, click on the year for full details of each election. Boundary changes took place for the 2002 election, leading to the whole council being elected in that year and reducing the number of seats by four.

1973 Craven District Council election
1976 Craven District Council election
1979 Craven District Council election (New ward boundaries)
1980 Craven District Council election
1982 Craven District Council election
1983 Craven District Council election (District boundary changes took place but the number of seats remained the same)
1984 Craven District Council election
1986 Craven District Council election
1987 Craven District Council election

District result maps

By-election results
By-elections occur when seats become vacant between council elections. Below is a summary of recent by-elections; full by-election results can be found by clicking on the by-election name.

References

External links
Craven District Council